Oklahoma Women's Hall of Fame was established in 1982 by Oklahoma Governor George Nigh "to honor Oklahoma women who are pioneers in their field or in a project that benefits Oklahoma; who have made a significant contribution to the State of Oklahoma; who serve or have served as role models to other Oklahoma women; who may be "unsung heroes," but have made a difference in the lives of Oklahomans or Americans because of their actions; who have championed other women, women's issues, or served as public policy advocates for the issues important to women; and who exemplify the Oklahoma spirit."

The Oklahoma Women's Hall of Fame is one of several events sponsored by the Oklahoma Commission on the Status of Women to support its mission, "To improve the quality of life for women, children and families in Oklahoma."

Eligibility requirements
 Must be a woman who has either lived in the State of Oklahoma for a major portion of her life or who is easily identified as an Oklahoman;
 Must not be a current member of the Oklahoma Commission on the Status of Women;

And shall include:
 Women who are pioneers in their field or in a project that benefits Oklahoma.
 Women who have made a significant contribution to the State of Oklahoma.
 Women who serve or have served as role models to other Oklahoma women.
 Women who may be "unsung heroes" but have made a difference in the lives of Oklahomans or Americans because of their actions.
 Women who have championed other women, women's issues, or served as public policy advocates for the issues important to women.
 Women who exemplify the Oklahoma spirit.

Inductees

Notes

References

External links
Photo Archive of 2007 Oklahoma Women's Hall of Fame induction ceremony
 National Women's Hall of Fame, Women of the Hall

Halls of fame in Oklahoma
State halls of fame in the United States
Women's halls of fame
Feminism and history
Lists of American women
Women's museums in Oklahoma
Biographical museums in Oklahoma
Awards established in 1982
Women in Oklahoma
1982 establishments in Oklahoma
Oral history